Euphaedra eberti is a butterfly in the family Nymphalidae. It is found in the Democratic Republic of the Congo, the Central African Republic and Uganda.

Description
 
E. eberti Auriv. (44 d) is perhaps only an extreme form of themis, with which it is connected to some extent by niveovittata ; on the other hand it approximates closely to the forms sarita and inanum, scarcely differing from them except in the reddish spot at the base of the costal margin on the underside of the hindwing. Both wings beneath without black discal spots and with indistinct or greenish, small submarginal spots; the subapical band of the forewing is in the entirely absent on both  surfaces or is white, as in the female: the male the forewing above is marked quite as in sarita (44 c), with green or blue spots on the fore wing which are not sharply defined; the under surface has distinct black spots in the cells and often also at the base of cellule 8 on the hindwing and in the male a brown-yellow ground-colour, which is only in the cell and in cellule 7 of the hindwing more or less tinged with bluish; in the female the under surface is darker, grey-brown, but often broadly suffused with light bluish in the basal part of both wings; the hindwing 
wing has usually a broad white median band between vein 3 and the costal margin.

Subspecies
Euphaedra eberti eberti (northern Democratic Republic of the Congo, Central African Republic)
Euphaedra eberti hamus Berger, 1940 (eastern Democratic Republic of the Congo, Uganda: Semuliki National Park, Rwenzori)

References

Butterflies described in 1896
eberti
Butterflies of Africa
Taxa named by Per Olof Christopher Aurivillius